The 2014 Kenyan Premier League (known as the Tusker Premier League for sponsorship reasons) was the eleventh season of the Kenyan Premier League since it began in 2003. It was also the 51st season of top division football in Kenya since 1963. Gor Mahia won the league title for the second consecutive season, earning a place in the preliminary round of the 2015 CAF Champions League while 2014 FKF President's Cup champions Sofapaka represented Kenya in the preliminary round of the 2014 CAF Confederation Cup. The two teams faced each other at the 2015 Kenyan Super Cup.

A total of 16 teams competed for the league, with fourteen returning from the 2013 season and the promotion play-off winners of FKF Division One, which has since become the third tier of the Kenyan football league system after the introduction of the National Super League on 10 July 2013.

Changes from last season

Relegated from Premier League
 Kakamega Homeboyz
 Karuturi Sports

Promoted from Division One
 Kenya Revenue Authority
 Top Fry AllStars

Teams
Half of the 16 participating teams are based in the capital, Nairobi, while Bandari is the only team based at the Coast.

Stadia and locations

Head coaches

Hooliganism
On 11 May 2014, the match between Thika United and A.F.C. Leopards was the season's first to be abandoned after fans of the latter invaded the pitch in the 85th minute, frustrated by their team's failure to get on the score sheet. At the time the match was called off, Thika United were leading 1–0. The KPL awarded Thika United a 2–0 victory, and A.F.C. Leopards were handed a fine of KSh.500,000/= to be paid by 20 June 2014.

On 26 October 2014, fans of Gor Mahia turned violent at the Kenyatta Stadium in Machakos after their team's 3–2 loss to Sofapaka. Fans began throwing objects at the police after the match, and over an hour after the game both teams and a number of fans were still stranded at the stadium. Following the match, Machakos County governor Alfred Mutua released a statement on behalf of the county government, banning Gor Mahia from the stadium "until further notice", and charging them KSh.10 million/= as compensation for damage caused to public and private property. The Football Kenya Federation then fined the club KSh.500,000/= for the crowd trouble and ordered them to play their remaining league games behind closed doors, while Sofapaka were also fined KSh.300,000/= for failing to place sufficient security measures in the stadium as the host team. However, in response to the sanctions imposed on Gor Mahia by the Machakos County government, the club's secretary-general Chris Omondi announced that the club would not be "paying any cent to Mutua", questioning his authority to impose a ban on the club.

League table

Positions by round
The table lists the positions of teams after each week of matches. In order to preserve chronological evolutions, any postponed matches are not included to the round at which they were originally scheduled, but added to the full round they were played immediately afterwards. For example, if a match is scheduled for matchday 13, but then postponed and played between days 16 and 17, it will be added to the standings for day 16.

Results

Top scorers

Last updated: 8 November 2014

Hat-tricks

See also
 2014 FKF President's Cup
 2014 KPL Top 8 Cup
 2014 Kenyan Super Cup

References

Kenya
Kenyan
Kenya
Kenyan
1
2014